Kiawah may refer to 

 Kiawah Island, South Carolina
 the Kiawah people formerly of the South Carolina Low Country